An international distress frequency is a radio frequency that is designated for emergency communication by international agreement.

History 
For much of the 20th century,  500 kHz was the primary international distress frequency. Its use has been phased out in favor of the Global Maritime Distress Safety System.

Use of some distress frequencies is permitted for calling other stations to establish contact, whereupon the stations move to another frequency. Such channels are known as distress, safety and calling frequencies.

Satellite processing from all 121.5 or 243 MHz locators has been discontinued. Since February 1, 2009, the U.S. Coast Guard only monitors distress signals from emergency position indicating radio beacons (EPIRBs) that broadcast using digital 406 MHz signals. Digital 406 MHz models became the only ones approved for use in both commercial and recreational watercraft worldwide on January 1, 2007.

Maritime Mobile Service frequencies 
International distress frequencies, currently in use are:

 2182 kHz for medium range maritime voice use.  The US Coast Guard has said "beginning August 1st, 2013 the Coast Guard would no longer monitor 2182 kHz". Many other MRCCs, for example most in Northern Europe, now only have MF capabilities and no HF.
 Several HF maritime voice frequencies exist for long-distance distress calls:
 4125 kHz
 6215 kHz
 8291 kHz
 12290 kHz
 16420 kHz
 Marine VHF radio Channel 16 (156.8 MHz) for short range maritime use
 406 MHz to 406.1 MHz is used by the Cospas-Sarsat international satellite-based search and rescue (SAR) distress alert detection and information distribution system

Digital selective calling frequencies 
Several maritime frequencies are used for digital selective calling (DSC), and they are also monitored for DSC distress signals:
 2.1875 MHz
 4.2075 MHz
 6.312 MHz
 8.4145 MHz
 12.577 MHz
 16.8045 MHz
 156.525 MHz, Marine VHF radio Channel 70

Aeronautical frequencies 
 121.5 MHz is the civilian aircraft emergency frequency or International Air Distress frequency.  It is used by some civilian emergency locator beacons; however, the Cospas-Sarsat system no longer monitors the frequency.
 243 MHz for NATO military aircraft emergency frequencies
 406 MHz to 406.1 MHz is used by the Cospas-Sarsat international satellite-based search and rescue (SAR) distress alert detection and information distribution system

Search And Rescue frequencies 
 123.1 MHz: Aeronautical Auxiliary Frequency (International voice for coordinated SAR operations).
 138.78 MHz—  U.S. military  voice  SAR  on-the-scene  use.  This  frequency  is  also  used  for direction finding (DF).
 155.160 MHz
 172.5 MHz— U.S. Navy emergency sonobuoy communications and homing use. This frequency is monitored by all U.S. Navy ASW aircraft assigned to a SAR mission.
 282.8 MHz— Joint/combined  on-the-scene voice and DF frequency used throughout NATO
 406 MHz / 406.1 MHz - Cospas-Sarsat international satellite-based search and rescue (SAR) distress alert detection and information distribution system
 Emergency position-indicating radiobeacon station (EPIRB)
 Search and rescue transponder (SART)
 Survival radio

Amateur radio frequencies

VHF, UHF calling frequencies can also be used to make emergency calls

MF and HF frequencies 

 Emergency Centre of Activity (ECOA) frequencies informally established by the International Amateur Radio Union regional organizations:

 Emergency/Disaster Relief Interoperation Voice Channels of the amateur radio Global ALE High Frequency Network:
 3791.0 kHz USB
 7185.5 kHz USB
 10145.5 kHz USB
 14346.0 kHz USB
 18117.5 kHz USB
 21432.5 kHz USB
 24932.0 kHz USB
 28312.5 kHz USB

Other frequencies 
 Citizens band (CB) radio (not available in all countries)
 Emergency channels 9 (27.065 MHz AM) and 19 (27.185 MHz AM)
 GMRS: 462.675 MHz is a UHF mobile distress and road information calling frequency allocated to the General Mobile Radio Service and used throughout Alaska and Canada for emergency communications; sometimes referred to as "Orange Dot" by some transceiver manufacturers who associated a frequency with a color-code for ease of channel coordination, until the creation of the Family Radio Service, in 1996, "GMRS 675" or Channel 6/20 on mobile radios today.  Its bandwidth can vary between 12.5, 25 and 50 kHz, and is also allocated to Ch. 20 on 22-channel FRS/GMRS "blister pack" radios.  It can have a repeater input frequency of 467.675 MHz, and a tone squelch of 141.3 Hz.  After FCC deregulation of simplex FRS/GMRS radios, FRS users may transmit up to 2 watts on the GMRS emergency channel 20 (462.675 MHz) with 141.3 Hz CTCSS, or channel 20-22.  
 MURS: 151.940 MHz (only available in the United States)
 FRS: FRS channel 1: 462.5625 MHz (carrier squelch, no tone or sub-channel), channel 3: 462.6125 MHz and channel 20: 462.6750 MHz (141.3 Hz CTCSS - channel 20, code 22 or channel 20-22).
 UHF CB (Australia): Emergency channels 5/35 (476.525/477.275 MHz). Channel 5 is the designated simplex and repeater output emergency channel, while channel 35 is used as the repeater input frequency for duplex operation.  UHF CB is only available in Australia and New Zealand.
 PMR446 (Europe): Channel 1 analog (446.00625 MHz, CTCSS 100.0 Hz, channel 1/12), Channel 8 analog (446.09375 MHz, CTCSS 123.0 Hz, channel 8/18).
 PMR446 (Europe): Mountain Rescue Channel 7 analog (446.08125 MHz) , CTCSS 85.4 Hz (Channel 7/7 in most radios, not all)

See also
Aircraft emergency frequency
Distress signal
Global Maritime Distress Safety System
Mayday
SOS

References 

Distress signals
Emergency communication
International telecommunications
Radio communications